This is a list of caves in the United States.

Alabama

Cathedral Caverns
Crystal Cavern
DeSoto Caverns
Dust Cave
Fern Cave
Manitou Cave
Rickwood Caverns
Russell Cave
Sauta Cave
Shelta Cave

Alaska
On Your Knees Cave
Trail Creek Caves

Arizona

Antelope Cave
Bat Cave mine
Cave of the Bells
Colossal Cave
Coronado Cave
Grand Canyon Caverns
Kartchner Caverns
Lava River Cave
Onyx Cave
Peppersauce Cave
Skeleton Cave
Ventana Cave

Arkansas

Blanchard Springs Caverns
Bull Shoals Caverns
Cosmic Cavern
Logan Cave
Crystal Dome Cavern
Mystic Caverns
Old Spanish Treasure Cave
Onyx Cave
Wonderland Cave

California

Black Chasm Cavern
Boyden Cave
Burro Flats Painted Cave
California Caverns
Chumash Painted Cave
Crystal Cave
Hall City Cave
Infernal Caverns
Lake Shasta Caverns
Lava Beds National Monument
Mercer Caverns
Mitchell Caverns
Moaning Cavern
Mud Caves
Ursa Minor

Colorado
Cave of the Winds
Glenwood Caverns
Mantle's Cave
Spring Cave

Connecticut
Tory Cave

Delaware
Beaver Valley Rock Shelter Site

Florida
Devil's Den Cave
Florida Caverns State Park
Warren's Cave

Georgia
Ellison's Cave
Kingston Saltpeter Cave
Pettyjohn Cave

Hawaii
Bobcat Trail Habitation Cave
Fern Grotto
Kaumana Cave
Kazumura Cave
Makauwahi Cave

Idaho
Craters of the Moon National Monument and Preserve
Kuna Caves
Minnetonka Cave
Niter Ice Cave
Wilson Butte Cave

Illinois
Cave-in-Rock
Illinois Caverns

Indiana

Bluespring Caverns
Buckner Cave
Indian Caverns
Marengo Cave
Shawnee Cave
Siberts Cave
Squire Boone Caverns
Twin Caves
Wyandotte Cave

Iowa
Cold Water Cave
Decorah Ice Cave
Maquoketa Caves
Spook Cave

Kentucky

Bat Cave
Carter Caves State Park
Cascade Caverns
Colossal Cavern
Diamond Caverns
Eleven Jones Cave
Fisher Ridge Cave System
Glover's Cave
Goochland Cave
Great Onyx Cave
Great Saltpetre Cave
Horse Cave also known as "Hidden River Cave"
Lost River Cave
Mammoth Cave
Martin Ridge Cave System
Mega Cavern
Oligo-Nunk Cave System

Maryland

Crystal Grottoes
Cumberland Bone Cave

Massachusetts
Horse Caves
King Phillip's Cave

Michigan
Devil's Kitchen
Pellerito Cave
Hendrie River Water Cave
Skull Cave

Minnesota
 Cold Water Spring State Preserve
 Forestville Mystery Cave State Park
Niagara Cave, Harmony
 Spring Valley Caverns
 Tyson Spring Cave
 Wabasha Street Caves

Missouri

Bluff Dweller's Cave
Bridal Cave
Caves of St. Louis
Cliff Cave
Current River Cavern
Devils Well
Fantastic Caverns
Graham Cave
Jacobs Cavern
Mark Twain Cave
Marvel Cave
Meramec Caverns
Onondaga Cave State Park
Onyx Cave
Ozark Caverns
Research Cave
Riverbluff Cave
Talking Rocks Cavern

Montana
Lewis and Clark Caverns
Pictograph Cave
Tears of the Turtle Cave

Nevada
Devils Hole
Gypsum Cave
Hidden Cave
Humboldt Cave
Lehman Caves
Lovelock Cave
Toquima Cave

New Hampshire
Batcheller's Cave
Lost River Reservation
Polar Caves

New Mexico

Bandera Volcano Ice Cave
Burnet Cave
Carlsbad Caverns
Conkling Cavern
El Malpais National Monument
Fox Cave
Lechuguilla Cave
Pendejo Cave
Sandia Cave
Shelter Cave
Snowy River Cave

New York
Cave of the Winds 
Clarksville Cave
Ellenville Fault Ice Caves
Howe Caverns
Lockport Cave
Schroeder's Pants Cave
Tory Cave

North Carolina
Boone's Cave
Linville Caverns

Ohio
Crystal Cave
Mary Campbell Cave
Ohio Caverns
Olentangy Indian Caverns
Seneca Caverns
Zane Shawnee Caverns

Oklahoma
Alabaster Caverns
Robbers Cave

Oregon

Arnold Lava Tube System
Boyd Cave
Derrick Cave
Fort Rock Cave
Horse Lava Tube System
Lava River Cave
Oregon Caves National Monument
Paisley Caves
Redmond Caves
Sandy Glacier Caves
Sea Lion Caves
Skeleton Cave
Skylight Cave

Pennsylvania

Crystal Cave
Indian Caverns
Indian Echo Caverns
Laurel Caverns
Lost River Caverns
Penns Cave
Port Kennedy Bone Cave
Tytoona Cave

South Dakota
Jewel Cave
Rushmore Cave
Sitting Bull Crystal Caverns
Wind Cave

Tennessee

Bell Witch Cave
Blue Spring Cave
Big Bone Cave
Craighead Caverns - also called Lost Sea 
Cumberland Caverns
Dunbar Cave
Forbidden Caverns
Gillespie Cave
Hubbard's Cave
Lookout Mountain Caverns
Lost Cove Cave
Nickajack Cave
Raccoon Mountain Caverns
Ruby Falls
Snail Shell Cave
Tuckaleechee Caverns

Texas

Airmen's Cave
Baker Cave
Bracken Cave
Cascade Caverns
Cave Without a Name
Caverns of Sonora
Inner Space Cavern
Jacob's Well
Kickapoo Cavern
Longhorn Cavern
Natural Bridge Caverns
Rock Dove Cave
Spring Creek Cave
Wonder Cave

Utah

Bechan Cave
Blowhole Cave
Danger Cave
Hogup Cave
Mammoth Cave
Moqui Cave
Neff's Cave
Nutty Putty Cave
Timpanogos Cave

Vermont
Aeolus Cave
Tory's Cave

Virginia

Bull Thistle Cave
The Caverns at Natural Bridge
Clarks Cave
Dixie Caverns
Endless Caverns
Gap Cave
Grand Caverns, formerly "Weyer's cave"
Indian Jim's Cave
Luray Caverns
Melrose Caverns
Natural Tunnel
Ogdens Cave
Shenandoah Caverns
Skyline Caverns
Stay High Cave
Unthanks Cave

Washington
Ape Cave
Big Four Ice Caves
Cheese Cave
Gardner Cave
Marmes Rockshelter
Paradise Ice Caves

West Virginia

Cass Cave
Charles Town Cave
Haynes Cave
Hellhole
Lost World Caverns
Organ Cave
Seneca Caverns
Sinks of Gandy
Smoke Hole Caverns

Wisconsin

Cave of the Mounds
Cherney Maribel Caves
Crystal Cave
Eagle Cave
Ledge View Nature Center
Samuels' Cave
St. John Mine
Tainter Cave

Wyoming
Natural Trap Cave
Shoshone Cavern National Monument
Tongue River Cave

See also
List of caves
List of longest caves in the United States
 Speleology

References

External links

List of U.S.A. Long Caves
List of U.S.A Deep Caves